Brent Catchpole is a New Zealand politician. He is a member of New Zealand First and served as president of the party.

Professional life
Before entering politics, Catchpole worked first as an accountant and then as a marketing director for a tourism company. He now works as a political lobbying consultant. In 2015 he was elected party president of New Zealand First.

Political career

Member of Parliament

He was elected to Parliament as a list MP in the 2002 election, but lost his seat in the 2005 election. He was his party's spokesperson on Communications & IT, Environment, Biosecurity, Internal Affairs, and Tourism portfolios.

Local body politics
In 2007 he was elected to the Papakura District Council in the Ardmore ward. He had also contested the Papakura mayoralty that year, but placed third behind Calum Penrose, who was successful, and the incumbent John Robertson.

In the 2010 local body elections, he stood for the Papakura Local Board and the Counties Manukau District Health Board. He was successful with the local board, but unsuccessful with the District Health Board.

Catchpole was re-elected to the Papakura Local Board at the 2016 Auckland elections and again at the 2019 Auckland elections.

References

Year of birth missing (living people)
Living people
New Zealand First MPs
New Zealand list MPs
Local politicians in New Zealand
Unsuccessful candidates in the 2011 New Zealand general election
Members of the New Zealand House of Representatives
Unsuccessful candidates in the 1999 New Zealand general election
Unsuccessful candidates in the 2005 New Zealand general election
Unsuccessful candidates in the 2008 New Zealand general election
Unsuccessful candidates in the 2014 New Zealand general election
21st-century New Zealand politicians